Richard Joseph Fitzgerald (1881–1956) was an Irish-born Roman Catholic prelate who served as the Bishop of Gibraltar from 1927 to 1956.

Born in Midleton, County Cork, Ireland on 12 August 1881, he was ordained to the priesthood on 15 August 1905. He served as a curate in Macrrom Co. Cork. He was appointed the Bishop of the Diocese of Gibraltar by Pope Pius XI on 25 May 1927. His consecration to the Episcopate took place on 9 October 1927; the principal consecrator was the Most Reverend John Harty, Archbishop of Cashel, with the Most Reverend James Roche, Bishop of Ross and the Right Reverend Peter Amigo, Bishop of Southwark, serving as co-consecrators.

Bishop Fitzgerald died in office on 15 February 1956, aged 74.

References

1881 births
1956 deaths
20th-century Roman Catholic bishops of Gibraltar
Christian clergy from County Cork